"Never Givin' Up" is a song recorded by Canadian country music artist Rick Tippe. It was released in 1998 as the fifth single from his second studio album, Get Hot or Go Home. It peaked at number 14 on the RPM Country Tracks chart in June 1998.

Chart performance

Year-end charts

References

1996 songs
1998 singles
Rick Tippe songs
Music videos directed by Stephano Barberis